Springbrook High School is an American public high school, located in Montgomery County, Maryland, in the Washington, D.C. metropolitan area. It is located within the White Oak census-designated place, and has a Silver Spring mailing address. It is between the Colesville and White Oak communities.

Springbrook is a member of Montgomery County's Northeast Consortium, composed of Springbrook, James Hubert Blake and Paint Branch high schools, allowing students from the communities of Ashton, Burnt Mills, Burtonsville, Calverton, Cloverly, Colesville, Fairland, Spencerville, southern Olney, Hillandale, and White Oak to choose between the three schools.

Springbrook was constructed in 1960 and named after the upper Northwest Branch spring-fed tributary that runs next to its property. The school was renovated in the early 1990s and reopened in 1994.

, the school holds 1,694 students. The total minority enrollment is 93.9%.

Rankings
As of 2022, U.S. News & World Report ranks Springbrook 2,386 out of 17,843 U.S. high schools, and 54 out of 269 Maryland high schools. The ranking is based on six factors relating to performance on state assessments and preparedness for college. Springbrook is ranked 18th out of the 30 high schools of Montgomery County Public Schools.

Springbrook draws its students from Montgomery County's Northeast Consortium, a population also served by two other public high schools, Blake and Paint Branch, which U.S. News & World Report ranks 34 and 41 respectively (out of Maryland high schools).

As of 2022, the graduation rate is 83%, which is somewhat below the state median.

Academic programs
The International Baccalaureate (IB) curriculum is a program offering at Springbrook. It includes the Middle Years Program, featuring a Personal Project, for 9th and 10th graders, and the IB Diploma Program for 11th and 12th graders. In addition, Springbrook offers an Advanced Placement (AP) program. Students may start taking AP courses as early as their freshman year with AP U.S. History. As of 2022, The AP participation rate at Springbrook is 75%. Springbrook is one of the 25 Maryland high schools that sends the most students to the University of Maryland's Clark School of Engineering, the only NEC high school included in that list.

Another Springbrook program is the Academy of Information Technology (AOIT). AOIT is a four-year program which is offered to students interested in computer programming, web development, the aesthetics of designing for the web, basic engineering, microcomputer technologies and LAN Management. Upon completion of the instructional phase, juniors (over the summer) and seniors (during the school year) may be placed in paid internships with employers such as the FDA, NOAA, NASA, USDA, Lockheed Martin, and Northrop Grumman, etc. The Cisco Networking Academy presents basic networking education to equip students with knowledge and skills that can be applied toward entry-level careers in IT networking and CCENT or CCNA certification. The school has 16 computer labs with 900 computers, translating into a computer for every 2.3 students. Springbrook's computer science program is among the oldest in the state and includes courses in Java and XNA, digital art, LAN management, computer maintenance, and web design.

Springbrook also houses the Justice, Law and Society Academy for the Northeast Consortium. The program is designed for students interested in exploring careers in law, law enforcement and government.

Springbrook's music program was awarded Grammy Signature School status in 2008, recognizing Springbrook as one of the top high school music programs in the nation. The music program has won a number of Superior ratings as well as first place awards in local, national and international music festivals across the nation as well as in Canada. Springbrook's performing ensembles include Symphonic Band (open to all students), Jazz Band (advanced level honors), Symphonic Band, Marching Band,  as well as audition-only chamber music ensembles (Strings, Woodwind, Brass-Wind, Percussion and a Jazz Combo). Springbrook's annual Summer Instrumental Music and Jazz Camp, open to middle and high school students from throughout Montgomery County, has been a tradition since 2002. Art classes offered at Springbrook include Foundations of Art, Photography, Ceramics, Studio, 3D Art, TV Production, IB and AP Art and Digital Art.

Springbrook was home to a Navy Junior Reserve Officers' Training Corps (NJROTC) unit, however, it was disbanded in 2010 after having poor enrollment figures for several years. The remnants of the unit were consolidated into a preexisting one at neighboring Paint Branch High School.

Scholarship
Springbrook's students are drawn from a range of racial, ethnic, and economic backgrounds, with roots in 84 nations. Springbook's diversity is reflected in the school's Hall of Nations and celebrated in an annual Heritage Show which showcases student talent including dance ensembles from several cultures.

Springbrook's IB, AP, and Honors programs have produced outstanding scholars. Members of Springbrook's graduating classes of 2004–2006 have gone on to attend universities including American, Amherst, Brown, Boston College, Carnegie Mellon, Columbia, Cornell, Dartmouth, Davidson, Duke, Georgetown, George Washington, Hampton, Johns Hopkins, Massachusetts Institute of Technology, Morehouse, New York University, Northwestern, Oxford, Princeton, Rutgers, Stanford, Vanderbilt, Yale, and the Universities of Massachusetts, Chicago, Delaware, Illinois, Maryland, Michigan, North Carolina, Pennsylvania, Toronto, Virginia, and Wisconsin–Madison. See complete college destinations of Springbrook classes of 2007, 2006, 2005, and 2004.

The Washington Post publishes a Challenge Index based on statistical analysis of academic rigor and achievement among high schools in the Washington metropolitan area (covering school districts in Maryland, Northern Virginia, and the District of Columbia).  In the December 2006 Challenge Index, Springbrook ranked 7 out of 23 high schools in Montgomery County, and 26 among 185 high schools in the metro area; and placed well ahead of its traditional peer schools (and athletic rivals), Blair (a science magnet school, ranked 33 in the metro area), Paint Branch (62), and Blake (94).

Annual Distinguished Student Awards
Springbrook annually bestows five Distinguished Student Awards:
 Richard C. Ahlberg Award – presented in honor of Springbrook High School's first principal to the senior with outstanding service to school and community.
 Dr. Thomas P. Marshall Award – presented in honor of Springbrook High School second principal to a senior whose scholastic career exemplifies the attributes of dedication to the Springbrook community, academic excellence, personal initiative, and versatility through participation in athletics, creative arts, performing arts, or leadership roles embraced by Dr. Marshall.
 David Cooper Robin Award – presented to a senior whose life was built on the cornerstones of academic superiority, personal integrity, enthusiasm, and an abiding respect for all individuals. David Cooper Robin was a Springbrook High School student.
 Michael A. Durso Awards – two awards – presented to both a male and a female student, to honor those who have shown significant growth throughout their four years at Springbrook High School. Michael A. Durso was a principal at Springbrook High School.

Extracurricular activities and public service
Springbrook has numerous clubs and activities. The Blueprint Newspaper (winner of Columbia Scholastic Press Association's Gold Medal Award in 2010 and 2011) and the Trident Yearbook are both class offerings. Springbrook's most famous extracurricular activity, the marching band, is also offered as a class. The diverse offering of clubs includes:

 A Capella
 Arabic/Muslim Student Association
 Asian Culture Club
 Black Student Union
 Blueprint Newspaper Club
 Ceramics
 Chemistry Club
 Community Bridges, Inc.
 Debate Club
 Digital Art Club
 Drama Club
 Forensics
 Free Instinct
 German Club
 Green Team
 International Thespian Society
 Jazz Band
 Le Club Francophone
 Marching Band
 Math Team
 National Honor Society
 Robolicious (Robotics Club)
 Secret Ninja Art Club
 Springbrook Ambassadors
 Student Government Assn.
 TV & Video Production
 YMCA Go Girls!
 Women in Technology

Athletics
Since 1964, the Blue Devils have fielded a total of 18 state championship athletic teams, including seven state football championships between 1979 and 1989. The boys basketball team was a state finalist in 2003; the field hockey team was state champion in 2003 and state finalist in 2005; and the gymnastics team won the state title in 2003. In more recent years, the girls basketball and boys cross country teams have won state regional titles, and the boys lacrosse, boys tennis, track and field, and swim and dive teams were divisional champions.

Springbrook High School's varsity boys basketball team won their third consecutive 4A state championship on March 13, 2010, a feat that had never before been achieved on the 4A level (the highest) and only once on any other level.

Sports offered include:

Fall sports
Cheerleading (Varsity and Jr. Varsity)
Girls Cross Country (2011 Division Champions)
Boys Cross Country (2011 Division Champions)
Field Hockey (Varsity and Jr. Varsity) (Girls 2011 Division Champions)
Football (Varsity and Jr. Varsity)
Golf
Poms
Girls Soccer (Varsity and Jr. Varsity)
Boys Soccer (Varsity and Jr. Varsity)
Girls Tennis
Allied Track and Field
Girls Volleyball (Varsity and Jr. Varsity)

Winter sports
Girls Basketball (Varsity and Jr. Varsity)
Boys Basketball (Varsity and Jr. Varsity)
Allied Bocce
Varsity Cheerleading
Girls Indoor Track and Field
Boys Indoor Track and Field
Poms
Girls Swim and Dive
Boys Swim and Dive
Wrestling (Varsity and Jr. Varsity) (best record in the county for the previous five years)

Spring sports
Baseball (Varsity and Jr. Varsity)
Girls Lacrosse (Varsity and Jr. Varsity)
Boys Lacrosse (Varsity and Jr. Varsity)
Softball (Varsity and Jr. Varsity)
Boys Tennis
Girls Track and Field
Boys Track and Field
Boys Volleyball (Varsity and Jr. Varsity)
Coed Volleyball
Gymnastics

Teachers and faculty
As of 2022, the student to teacher ratio is 15:1. As of 2017, 83.8% of staff have over 5 years of professional experience and 54.2% of staff have more than 15 years of professional experience.

Notable teachers
Pat Yongpradit was one of 12 teachers worldwide to be awarded an Innovative Teacher Award in 2010 by Microsoft.  His approach to teaching helped double the number of girls in AP computer programming.

Joyce Amatucci was named the NFL's 2000 Teacher of the Year. She was nominated by a former student, Shawn Springs, who played football for the Seattle Seahawks at the time.

Notable alumni
Lewis Black (1966) – comedian | The Daily Show
Robert Aubry Davis (1967) – Host of WETA's "Millenium of Music"
Tom Brosius (1968) – Track and field athlete
John Bunting (1968) – former head football coach | University of North Carolina
Dana Lee Dembrow (1971) – Maryland legislator
Harold Solomon (1971) – tennis player ranked No. 5 in the world in 1980
C. J. Mahaney (1972) – evangelical minister
Lacy Clay (1974) – U.S. congressman | Democrat (MO-1)
Craig Esherick (1974) – former head basketball coach | Georgetown University
Susan Gelman (1975) – psychologist | University of Michigan
Carol Black (1976) – television producer and writer | creator, The Wonder Years
Wayne Duvall (1976) – actor | The Kitchen, O Brother Where Art Thou?, Leatherheads, The District | cousin of actor Robert Duvall
Louise Kellogg (1977) – geophysicist, University of California, Davis
Thalia Zedek (1979) – musician | Come, Live Skull, Uzi
Mary Page Keller (1979) – actress | JAG, Duet, Ryan's Hope, Timecop 2, TV movies
Chuck Driesell (1981) – former head basketball coach | The Citadel
Jim McArthur (1981) – Sr. Olympic Gold Medalist
Tina Fernandes Botts (1982) – philosophy professor | California State University, Fresno
Matthew Rabin (1981) – behavioral economist | Harvard University
Andrew Gelman (1982) – statistician and political scientist | Columbia University
Jill Rutten (1986) – soccer player who appeared for the United States women's national team
Jeri Ingram (1988) – tennis player
Shane Acker (1990) – Oscar nominated writer and director | 9 short film, 9
Kimberly Sellers (1990) – statistician
Michael Ealy (1991) – actor | The Intruder, Barbershop, Sleeper Cell, Underworld: Awakening, Their Eyes Were Watching God, Seven Pounds
Bram Weinstein (1991) – television sports anchor | ESPNews
Shawn Springs (1993) – former NFL Cornerback
Doris Tsao (1993) – neuroscientist | California Institute of Technology
Steve Weissman (1997) – television sports anchor | ESPN
Joanna Lohman (2000) – professional women's Soccer | Washington Spirit
Zachary Kirkhorn (2002) – finance | Tesla
Brandon Broady (2004) – comedian/TV Host  | Nickelodeon's Crashletes, 106 & Park (Correspondent)
Folarin Campbell (2004) – basketball player | George Mason University
Dave East (2006) – rapper
Jamal Olasewere (2009) – basketball player | Nigeria national basketball team
Demetric Austin (2012) – basketball player | Panionios B.C.
Isaiah Eisendorf (2014) - American-Israeli basketball player in the Israeli Basketball Premier League

References

External links
 Springbrook High School website
 Springbrook Athletics website
 GoBlueDevils.net Springbrook Athletics Boosters
 The Blueprint, Springbrook student newspaper
 Montgomery County Public Schools website
 Springbrook statistics from MCPS

Public high schools in Montgomery County, Maryland
International Baccalaureate schools in Maryland
Educational institutions established in 1960
1960 establishments in Maryland
Colesville, Maryland
White Oak, Maryland